Kormakitis FC is a Cypriot association football club based in Kormakitis, located in the Keryneia District. It has 2 participations in Cypriot Fourth Division. The club was founded in 1989 and is the theoretical continuitation of Kedros Kormakiti and Livanos Kormakiti.

References

Football clubs in Cyprus
Association football clubs established in 1989
1989 establishments in Cyprus